The 2017–18 Fulham season was the club's 120th professional season and fourth consecutive in the EFL Championship after their relegation from the Premier League in the 2013–14 campaign. Fulham also competed in the FA Cup and the EFL Cup. They were promoted to the Premier League on 26 May 2018, by winning 1–0 in the 2018 EFL Championship play-off Final against Aston Villa. The season covers the period from 1 July 2017 to 30 June 2018.

Transfers

Transfers in

Loans in

Transfers out

Loans out

Pre-season

Friendlies
Fulham announced five pre-season friendlies against Piast Gliwice, FC Zlin, Wolfsburg, West Ham United and Darmstadt 98.

A further friendly against Queens Park Rangers was played behind closed doors on the 12 July.

Competitions

Overall

EFL Championship

League table

Results summary

Results by matchday

Matches
On 21 June 2017, the league fixtures were announced.

Football League play-offs

FA Cup
In the FA Cup, Fulham entered the competition in the third round and were drawn at home to Southampton.

EFL Cup
On 16 June 2017, Fulham drew Wycombe Wanderers in the first round. The second round confirmed a home tie against Bristol Rovers.

Squad statistics

Appearances and goals

Last updated 26 May 2018.

Players listed with no appearances have been in the matchday squad but only as unused substitutes.

{{Efs player|no=16|nat=NIR|pos=MF|name=Oliver Norwood (on loan from Brighton & Hove Albion) 
|22+14|5|0+3|0|1+0|0|1+0|0}}

|- 
|colspan="12" style="text-align:center;" |Out on loan
|-

|-
|colspan="12" style="text-align:center;" |Left during season
|-

|-
|}

Top scorers
Includes all competitive matches. The list is sorted by squad number when total goals are equal.Last updated 26 May 2018.''

Disciplinary record
Includes all competitive matches. The list is sorted by shirt number.

|-
|colspan=17|Out on loan
|-

|-
|colspan=4|TOTALS
|62
|1
|2
|1
|0
|0
|0
|0
|0
|63
|1
|2
|

Suspensions

References

Fulham F.C. seasons
Fulham FC Season, 2017-18
Fulham FC Season, 2017-18
Fulham